The 2016–17 Women's CEV Cup was the 45th edition of the European CEV Cup volleyball club tournament, the former "Top Teams Cup".

Format
The tournament was played on a knockout format, with 36 teams participating. Initially 22 teams were allocated vacancies to enter the competition, with 8 of them directly qualified to the 16th Finals on the basis of the latest CEV European Ranking List. 14 teams came from the CEV Women's Champions League qualification entering the competition at different stages (as per 'Round composition' below).

On 30 June 2016, a drawing of lots in Varna, Bulgaria, determined the team's pairing for each match. Each team plays a home and an away match with result points awarded for each leg (3 points for 3–0 or 3–1 wins, 2 points for 3–2 win, 1 point for 2–3 loss). After two legs, the team with the most result points advances to the next round. The Golden Set winner is the team that first obtains 15 points, provided that the points difference between the two teams is at least 2 points (thus, the Golden Set is similar to a tiebreak set in a normal match).

Round composition
 32nd Final: 14 teams + 2 teams from Champions League
 16th Final: 8 teams + 32nd Final winners (8 teams) + 8 teams from Champions League
 8th Final: 16th Final winners (12 teams) + 4 teams from Champions League
 4th Final onwards: winners

Participating teams
A total of 36 teams participate in the competition.
Drawing of lots was held in Varna, Bulgaria on 30 June 2016.

1.Team that received a 32nd Final bye.
2.Team that qualified via Champions League entering the 32nd Final.
3.Team that qualified via Champions League entering the 16th Final.
4.Team that qualified via Champions League entering the 8th Final.

Main phase

32nd Final
1st leg (Team #1 home) 13–15 December 2016
2nd leg (Team #2 home) 21–22 December 2016

16th Final
1st leg (Team #1 home) 11–12 January 2017
2nd leg (Team #2 home) 24–26 January 2017

8th Final
1st leg (Team #1 home) 7–8 February 2017
2nd leg (Team #2 home) 21–23 February 2017

*Note: A first leg, originally scheduled on 7 February 2017, did not take place as Vizura did not turn up for the match. Serbian press reported the Vizura team flight from Istanbul to Odessa had two aborted landing attempts due to bad weather (thick fog) before returning to Istanbul. The CEV with both clubs consent, decided a single match in a neutral venue (Brčko in Bosnia and Herzegovina) played behind closed doors as the way to determine the team advancing in the competition.

4th Final
1st leg (Team #1 home) 7–8 March 2017
2nd leg (Team #2 home) 15–16 March 2017

Final phase

Semifinals
1st leg (Team #1 home) 28 March 2017
2nd leg (Team #2 home) 1–2 April 2017

Final
1st leg (Team #1 home) 11 April 2017
2nd leg (Team #2 home) 15 April 2017

Awards

References

External links
 CEV Cup 16-17

Women's CEV Cup
CEV Cup
CEV Cup